Devil May Care (also rereleased as Lullaby of the Leaves) is the debut album by American jazz vocalist Teri Thornton featuring tracks recorded in late 1960 and early 1961 for the Riverside label.

Reception

Allmusic awarded the album 4½ stars with the review by Michael G. Nastos stating, "This is an important document of a truly great jazz singer, and is essential in the collection of every serious aficionado".

Track listing
 "Lullaby of the Leaves" (Bernice Petkere, Joe Young) - 2:48  
 "Devil May Care" (Bob Dorough) - 2:47  
 "Detour Ahead" (Lou Carter, Herb Ellis, Johnny Frigo) - 3:10  
 "The Song Is You" (Oscar Hammerstein II, Jerome Kern) - 2:33  
 "My Old Flame" (Sam Coslow, Arthur Johnston) - 3:29  
 "What's Your Story, Morning Glory?" (Jack Lawrence, Paul Francis Webster, Mary Lou Williams) - 3:47  
 "Dancing in the Dark" (Howard Dietz, Arthur Schwartz) - 2:31  
 "Left Alone" (Billie Holiday, Mal Waldron) - 3:27  
 "Blue Champagne" (Jim Eaton, Frank L. Ryerson, Grady Watts) - 3:11  
 "I Feel a Song Coming On" (Dorothy Fields, Jimmy McHugh, George Oppenheimer) - 2:42  
 "What's New?" (Johnny Burke, Bob Haggart) - 4:11  
 "Blue Skies" (Irving Berlin) - 2:33

Personnel 
Teri Thornton - vocals
Clark Terry - flugelhorn, trumpet 
Britt Woodman - trombone
Earle Warren - alto saxophone 
Seldon Powell - tenor saxophone
Wynton Kelly - piano
Freddie Green (tracks 1, 3, 5, 7, 9 & 12), Sam Herman (tracks 2, 4, 6, 8, 10 & 11) - guitar 
Sam Jones - bass
Jimmy Cobb - drums
Norman Simmons - arranger
Recorded in New York City on December 23, 1960 (tracks 1, 3, 5, 7, 9 & 12) and January 10, 1961 (tracks 2, 4, 6, 8, 10 & 11).

References 

1961 debut albums
Teri Thornton albums
Albums produced by Orrin Keepnews
Riverside Records albums